Recycling antimatter pertains to recycling antiprotons and antihydrogen atoms.

References

Further reading

Fermilab
Antimatter
Research projects
Recycling by material